Rafael Ramírez may refer to:

Rafael Ramírez (baseball),  Dominican baseball player
Rafael Ramírez (politician), Venezuelan politician
One name for Ángel Maturino Reséndiz, the "Railroad killer"